Sokkate (29 March 1001 – 11 August 1044) was king of Pagan dynasty of Burma (Myanmar) from 1038 to 1044. The king lost his life in a single combat with Anawrahta, who succeeded him and went on to found the Pagan Empire.

According to the chronicles, Sokkate was a son of King Nyaung-u Sawrahan whose reign was usurped by King Kunhsaw Kyaunghpyu. Kunhsaw married Nyuang-u's three chief queens, two of whom were pregnant and subsequently gave birth to Kyiso and Sokkate. Sokkate and Kyiso were raised by Kunhsaw as his own sons. When the two sons reached manhood, they forced Kunhsaw to abdicate the throne and become a monk. When Sokkate became king, he took one of Kunhsaw's queens who had given birth to Anawrahta. When Anawrahta came of age, he challenged Sokkate to single combat, and killed the king.

Dates
Various chronicles do not agree on the dates regarding his life and reign. The oldest chronicle Zatadawbon Yazawin is considered to be the most accurate for the Pagan period. However, Zata itself is contradictory in its reporting of his birth date: its regnal list and horoscope sections report different birth dates. The table below lists the dates given by four main chronicles, as well as Hmannan's dates when anchored by the Anawrahta's inscriptionally verified accession date of 1044. The length of reign is given as 6 years by Zata but according to the other chronicles, it was Kyiso, the predecessor, who ruled for six years. Moreover, according to Hmannan, Sokkate was three months younger than his half-brother Kyiso.

Accession
Sokkate succeeded his brother Kyiso at age 36 c. 1 April 1038.

Notes

References

Bibliography
 
 
 
 
 
 
 

Pagan dynasty
1001 births
1044 deaths
11th-century Burmese monarchs